Otto Hartmann (11 September 1884 – 10 July 1952) was a German general in the Wehrmacht during World War II. He was a recipient of the Knight's Cross of the Iron Cross of Nazi Germany.

Awards and decorations

 Knight's Cross of the Iron Cross on 5 August 1940 as General der Artillerie and commander of XXX. Armeekorps

References

Citations

Bibliography

1884 births
1952 deaths
German Army generals of World War II
Generals of Artillery (Wehrmacht)
German Army personnel of World War I
German prisoners of war in World War II
Grand Crosses of the Order of the Crown (Romania)
Military personnel from Munich
People from the Kingdom of Bavaria
Recipients of the clasp to the Iron Cross, 1st class
Recipients of the Knight's Cross of the Iron Cross
Recipients of the Silver Liakat Medal
Reichswehr personnel